Beldeutas is a village in Karkaraly District, Karaganda Region, Kazakhstan. It is part of the Amanzholov Rural District (KATO code - 354837400). Population:

Geography  

References

Populated places in Karaganda Region